Fictional characters who exhibit and/or have been diagnosed with bipolar disorder.

Film

Television

Comics

Literature

See also 
List of fictional characters with disabilities

References 

Lists of fictional characters
 
Characters